"Don't Tell Me No" is a song by the American New wave band, the Cars. The song, written by Ric Ocasek, appeared on the band's third studio album, Panorama.

Release and reception
"Don't Tell Me No" first saw release on the Panorama album in August 1980, but in November of that same year, the song was released as the follow-up single to the marginally successful "Touch and Go" single in America. However, unlike its predecessor, it failed to chart at all in said country.

AllMusic critic Greg Prato noted the track as an album highlight from Panorama, and went on to call it "strong, just not as well known as some of the other material [on the album]".  Record World said that "A steamroller rhythm section has its own way here while steaming guitars and Ric Ocasek's trademark vocal detachment ride high."  Billboard chose it as a "recommended" pick.

B-side
The song's B-side titled "Don't Go to Pieces", which was also the B-side to "Gimme Some Slack", includes rare backing vocals from lead guitarist Elliot Easton and keyboardist Greg Hawkes singing "You can make the switch, you can have your wish", followed by the band joining and singing the chorus "don't go to pieces, b-b-b-baby."

References

The Cars songs
1980 singles
Songs written by Ric Ocasek
Song recordings produced by Roy Thomas Baker
Elektra Records singles
1980 songs